Curitiba Rugby Clube is a Rugby Union team in the city of Curitiba, Paraná, Brazil. It is currently the biggest club in the state, with junior category, children, youth, men and women.

History
Mauro Callegary and Eduardo Laguarrigue created in December 1981, the Curitiba Rugby Club, but only the first practice took place in 1983 in Barigüi Park, after a major release with billboards around the city and schools. In the same year, the club is affiliated to the Brazilian Rugby Association.

Main Titles
Men's:
 Brazilian Rugby Championship 2 titles (2014, 2016)
 Brazilian Championships - B series 2 titles  (1989, 2005)
 Brazil Southern League 2 titles (2005, 2006)
 Paraná state Championships 7 titles (2006, 2007, 2008, 2009, 2011, 2012, 2013)

U-21:
 Brazilian Sevens Series  2 titles  (2008/09 and 2010/11))
 Brazil Southern League 2 titles (2007, 2010)

Current squad

References

External links
 Curitiba's Official Pages

Brazilian rugby union teams